Abraham de Revier Sr. was the first elder of the Old Dutch Church of Sleepy Hollow in Sleepy Hollow, New York when it was organized in 1697.

He was one of the ninety-six original members of the church and was the patriarch of a leading family in the Sleepy Hollow community. He has also been credited as the author of a private memorandum book that is now lost to history, which was heavily drawn upon in 1715 by Dirck Storm to compose the church's history. However, he signed his 1716 will by his mark, so it is more likely that the memoranda should be credited to his son, also named Abraham and a later elder of the church, who had predeceased his father about 1712.

The Old Dutch Church of Sleepy Hollow's book of records is one of the most significant records in Early American history. "Het Notite Boeck der Christelyckes Kercke op de Manner of Philips Burgh" is a rare surviving record of Dutch Colonial American village life in English-occupied New York province.

References

American clergy
People of the Province of New York
American members of the Dutch Reformed Church
Year of birth missing
Year of death missing